Jeg drepte! (I Have Killed!) is a Norwegian film directed by Toralf Sandø. It premiered on August 17, 1942.

Plot
A doctor is operating on a male patient. Under anesthesia, the man reveals that he is in a relationship with the doctor's wife. After the operation, complications arise, the man dies, and the doctor is convinced that he is the one that killed the man. In order to rid himself of the obsession, the hospital decides that he should do a similar operation and succeed with it. Because they do not dare risk any of the regular patients, the doctor's wife is selected for the procedure without him knowing who he is operating on.

Cast
 Rolf Christensen: Gunnar Bøhmer, a doctor
 Tore Foss: Kristian Solberg
 Guri Stormoen: Mrs. Fredriksen 
 Sigrun Otto: Miss Bull
 Gunvor Hall: Mrs. Johansen
 Joachim Holst-Jensen: Fredriksen
 Jack Fjeldstad: Bagge, a doctor 
 Synnøve Øian: Berit, a nurse 
 Johannes Eckhoff: Berg, a doctor 
 Oscar Amundsen: Bjørnstad, a doctor 
 Liv Uchermann Selmer: head nurse
 Grace Grung: surgery nurse 
 Ingeborg Cook: Agnete Larsen
 Edel Eriksen: Miss Berger
 Vivi Schøyen: office nurse 
 Arne Andresen: Frits 
 Reidun Ofstad: anesthesiology nurse
 Johanne Voss: Mrs. Solberg 
 Erna Enersen: Cecilie, a nurse
 Jens Gundersen: Hagen, a doctor 
 Erling Drangsholt: head physician Christensen
 Wenche Foss: Liv Bøhmer

Music
 "Mitt hjertes sang" (The Song of my Heart; melody: Jolly Kramer-Johansen, lyrics: Arne Paasche Aasen). Performed by Kramer Johansens Filmorkester with Ivar Cederholm. Recorded in Oslo in November 1942. Released on the 78 rpm record Columbia GN 836 (Side B).

References

External links 
 

1942 films
Norwegian drama films
Norwegian black-and-white films
1942 drama films
1940s Norwegian-language films
Films directed by Toralf Sandø